Maria Ubach i Font (born 14 June 1973) is an Andorran diplomat, serving as the Minister of Foreign Affairs since 17 June 2017 under the governments of Prime Minister Antoni Martí and the current Head Xavier Espot.

In 1998 she obtained a degree in economics from the University of Toulouse II-Le Mirail and a master's degree in International Relations from the University of Paris I Panthéon-Sorbonne.

Political and diplomatic career 
In 1998 she began her career at the Ministry of Foreign Affairs of Andorra as a technician. Until 2001 she was a permanent representative attached to the Council of Europe in Strasbourg. Between 2001 and 2006 she was the first secretary at the Embassy of Andorra in France and a permanent delegate attached to UNESCO. From 2006 until 2011, she was director of the Multilateral Affairs and Cooperation office of the Ministry.

Between October 2011 and June 2015 she was ambassador in France and Portugal (residing in Paris), as well as being a permanent delegate to UNESCO and representative to the Permanent Council of La Francophonie. Between 2015 and 2017 she was Ambassador to Belgium, the Netherlands, Luxembourg, Germany and the European Union, residing in Brussels.

As Minister, Ubach is leading the negotiations for an association agreement between Andorra and the European Union. She was reappointed by newly elected Prime Minister Xavier Espot on 22 May 2019.

References

1973 births
Living people
Andorran women in politics
Ambassadors of Andorra to France
Ambassadors of Andorra to Portugal
Ambassadors of Andorra to the European Union
Permanent Delegates of Andorra to UNESCO
Female foreign ministers
Women government ministers of Andorra
Democratic Party (Andorra) politicians
University of Paris alumni
University of Toulouse-Jean Jaurès alumni
People from La Massana
21st-century women politicians
21st-century diplomats
Foreign Ministers of Andorra
Andorran women ambassadors